Takeda Teva Ocean Arena (In Japanese : 武田テバオーシャンアリーナ) is a futsal arena  in Nagoya, Aichi Prefecture, Japan. This arena opened on 13 June 2008. This arena is specialized to futsal first in Asia. This arena is home arena of Nagoya Oceans in F.League. The exterior of this arena is inspired by Colosseum.

History 
 8 February 2007 – Start to construction.
 2 May 2008 – Finish to construction.
 13 June 2008 – Opened under the name Taiyo Pharmaceutical Ocean Arena.
 June 2008 – F.League Ocean Cup 1st edition was held.
 1 April 2012 –  Renamed to Teva Ocean Arena.
 August 2013 – 2013 AFC Futsal Club Championship was held.
 1 April 2017 – Renamed to Takeda Teva Ocean Arena.
 20 May 2017 – WBO world light flyweight title match Kosei Tanaka vs Ángel Acosta (no.1 contender and mandatory challenger of WBO) was held. 
 6–7 April 2019 – V.League 2018-19 Final was held.

Facilities 

 Main Arena
 Pitch size – 20 m × 40 m (800 m2)
 Height – 13 m
 Seats – 2,569 seats

 Sub Arena
 Pitch size – 20 m × 40 m (800 m2)
 Height – 13 m
 Seats – 190 seats

Access 
 1 minute walk from Aonami Line Kinjō-futō Station.

References

External links 
 
 

Futsal in Japan
Indoor arenas in Japan
Sports venues in Nagoya
Sports venues completed in 2008
2008 establishments in Japan